Girolamo Piccolomini may refer to:

 Girolamo Piccolomini (senior), Roman Catholic prelate
 Girolamo Piccolomini (junior) (died 1535), Roman Catholic prelate